Ong Kim Seng, was born in Singapore and has been a full-time artist since 1985. He has participated in group and solo exhibitions at Singapore and in the United States, China, United Kingdom, Japan, Australia, Belgium, Federal Republic of Germany, France, Middle East, Taiwan, Hong Kong, and the ASEAN countries.

Ong is the first and only Singaporean to have won six awards by the prestigious 138-year-old American Watercolor Society (AWS), of which he was conferred membership in 1992. He is also the only Asian artist outside the US to be admitted into AWS.

Early life 
An only child, Ong grew up in a kampung in Tiong Bahru under the care of his mother, Goh Choon Hoon. His father had died in 1952 when he was still young. To support the family, his mother worked as a washerwoman and grass cutter to put her son through school. Ong studied at Radin Mas Primary School in 1959 and later on at Pasir Panjang Secondary School. Ong had shown an interest in art since he was young but his mother had envisioned him becoming either a clerk or teacher with his education, than to have the ludicrous thought of becoming an artist. He began experimenting with painting, beginning with pastels and oil and moving onto watercolour painting in earnest since 1960. He then became a regular participant in a painting group at the Singapore River led by an artist, writer and lecturer Chia Wai Hon.

Ong left school in 1962 and after that joined an advertising agency where he worked as a bill collector. He left the agency after four years and found his next job as a policeman at the British Naval Base in Sembawang. He lost his job in 1971 when the British withdrew their troops from Singapore. He subsequently worked as a welder at Pulau Bukom, a line technician at an electronics firm, National Semiconductor, and an audio-visual/graphic technician at the Colombo Plan Staff College for Technician Education. 
In his working life, he had never stopped painting. In 1974, Ong got his first opportunity to present his watercolor artworks at a group show with artists Wan Soon Kam and Tan Jeuy Lee at the Meyer Gallery, organised by gallery owner and arts patron Della Butcher.
When the College relocated to Manila in 1986, Ong decided to become a full-time professional artist in spite of having to care for an elderly mother, and being married with a wife and three children in tow.

Ong and his art 
Ong is a self-taught artist, who never had any formal art training. As a realist painter, his works focus on inanimate objects, architectural form, masonry, foliage and landscape. His style is "naturalist cum impressionistic", which is " a combination of post-impressionist colour and the outlook of the American realist masters". He has held numerous solo and group exhibitions in the past three decades, had his works published by local and international publishers, and appeared on local arts television programmes.

In 1993 his work, 'Bhaktaphur' was the first Singapore watercolour painting to be auctioned by Sotheby's in Hong Kong. In March 1994, his work, 'Bali' was auctioned by Christie's in Singapore. His works are now auctioned annually in Singapore and in the region.

Ong's works have appeared in eight books by publishers in America, China and Singapore, including his Cultural Medallion project book Heartlands: Home And Nation In The Art Of Ong Kim Seng (2008). He was Founding Editor-South East Asia for International Artist and an article on his works appeared in the first issue of the magazine in June 1998. His artwork can be found in the Singapore Art Museum, Neka Museum in Bali, Maritime Museum in Sentosa and the Hawk Gallery in Oregon, US.

Auction history 
On 3 April 2017, Ong Kim Seng set a new personal record when his work was sold for HK$725,000 (S$130,540) at a Sotheby's Hong Kong auction. The acrylic on canvas painting, titled Nepal, fetched Ong his highest price in an international auction. It was sold to an Asian private collector.

His works of a similar scale tend to sell for a maximum of about $40,000. The painting is based on a street scene in Bhaktapur, a city in Nepal. Ong is fond of the country and had visited it yearly in the early 2000s. The work sold for double the pre-sale estimate of auction house Sotheby's after a contest involving about five bidders.

Mr Mok Kim Chuan, head of the modern and contemporary South- east Asian art department in Sotheby's, says Ong's larger format works, especially those on canvas, "are not often seen in the open market". "The scarcity of the work, of course in addition to the quality of the work, attracted interest and participation, with collectors wanting to seize the opportunity to acquire the work from one of Singapore's key artists," he adds.

Ms Ma Peiyi, senior curator at Artcommune gallery in Singapore, which represents Ong, says this record price does not come as a surprise.

Exhibitions 
Ong has participated in three major exhibitions:

The Art of Ong Kim Seng 
The Art of Ong Kim Seng was Ong's first solo exhibition. It took place in ElleSix Gallery, Malaysia, and showcased about 30 of his works in his first Malaysian solo exhibition. It showcased his most memorable paintings that have spanned over 36 years of his career as an artist and traveller. His collectors include Queen Elizabeth II of the United Kingdom, the Prime Minister of the People's Republic of China and the Secretary-General of the United Nations among other notable people.

Moments of Light 
Moments of Light was Ong's second solo exhibition, and showcased his works in monotypes, lithographs, paper pulp paintings and watercolours. It took from 29 September – 14 November 2004 at the Singapore Tyler Print Institute.

Timeless Jiangnan 
Timeless Jiangnan was a joint exhibition between Ong and photographer Kwek Leng Joo. It was held at the Singapore Conference Hall in September 2005.

Selected publications 
 Heartlands: Home And Nation In The Art Of Ong Kim Seng. 2008. Text & poems by Koh Buck Song. With an exhibition at the Singapore Art Museum. ISBN 978-981-08-1618-6.

Awards 
Ong has won six awards from the American Watercolor Society; the Paul B. Remmy Memorial Award in 1983, the Lucy B. Moore Award in 1988, the Clara Stroud Memorial Award in 1989 and the Barse Miller Memorial Award in 1992, Winsor & Newton Award in 2000 and the Ida Wells Memorial Award in 2001. He has been an active member of the society since 1990 and was the first Asian outside the US to be awarded membership. After having won five of its awards, Kim Seng was made a Dolphin Fellow of the AWS in 2000.

In 1990, he was awarded the Cultural Medallion for visual arts by the President of the Republic of Singapore.  The Cultural Medallion is administered by the Ministry of Information, Communications and the Arts. He was conferred as Dolphin Fellowship in 2000. He won the Excellence for Singapore Award presented by the Singapore Totaliser Board in 2000. He was also awarded the Singapore Internationale by the Singapore International Foundation in 2001. His most recent award is the 2001 Arts Supporter Award presented by the National Arts Council.

He has also received many other less significant awards. They include:
 1992 – Base Miller Memorial Award
 1995 – Pingat Apad
 2000 – Winsor & Newton Award
 2000 – Excellence for Singapore Award

Societies 
Ong is a signature member of the AWS, and has had his own work selected for the NWS's exhibition in California.

He was also President of the Singapore Watercolour Society from 1991 to 2001 when he became Honorary President, in which that capacity, he interacted with other watercolor organisations in the other parts of the world.

Ong Kim Seng was the Organizing Chairman of Asian Watercolours '97, the first international watercolor exhibition to be held in Singapore. He was also the vice-chairman of Singapore Art '97. He has been an Art Advisor to the National Arts Council since 1998 and is a life Fellow of the National University of Singapore's Centre of the Arts.

Private life 
Ong's interests include travelling, trekking, jogging, swimming and cycling. He enjoys meeting people and discovering their way of life. He has gone on travelling-cum-painting expeditions in the past, while "recording vanishing ways of life of exotic places" in his paintings.

An ardent trekker, Ong has visited the Tianshan region of Sinkiang in China, the Nepalese Himalayas and the Tibetan Plateau many times to paint and to trek.

As an artist himself, he is an avid fan of paintings. His collectors include Queen Elizabeth II of the United Kingdom, the Prime Minister of the People's Republic of China, the Secretary-General of the United Nations, President of the Republic of Korea, Prime Minister of the Kingdom of Thailand, the President of the Republic of the Philippines; the Prime Minister of Japan, the Prime Minister of India; the Governor of Hokkaido; Singapore Arts Museum; Singapore, Maritime Museum, the Agung Rai Museum and Neka Museum in Bali, Indonesia; the Ministry of Foreign Affairs headquarters, Foreign Missions and Embassies of the Republic of Singapore.

Ong is married with three children (Henry, Diane and Dora Ong).  His wife is Nam Ah Moy.

See also 
 List of painters by name
 Lists of painters

References

External links 
 Ong Kim Seng – Official Website
 Singapore Watercolour Society – Profile of Ong Kim Seng

1945 births
Living people
Singaporean people of Chinese descent
Singaporean artists
Singaporean painters
Recipients of the Cultural Medallion for art